The Netherlands Institute for Sound and Vision (Dutch: Nederlands Instituut voor Beeld en Geluid, or short, Beeld en Geluid) is the cultural archive and a museum located in Hilversum. The Institute for Sound and Vision collects, looks after, and provides access to over 70% of the Dutch audio-visual heritage. In total, the collection of more than 750,000 hours of [television, radio, music and film that began in 1898 and continues to grow daily, makes Sound and Vision one of the largest audiovisual [archive]s in Europe. It was founded in 1997 as the Netherlands Audiovisual Archive (Dutch: Nederlands Audiovisueel Archief (NAA)), and adopted its current name in 2002.

Sound and Vision is the business archive of the national broadcasting corporations, a cultural heritage institute (providing access to students and the general public) and also a museum for its visitors. The digital television production workflow and massive digitization efforts break grounds for new services.

Sound and Vision is an experienced partner in European funded research projects. These include, or have included: P2P-Fusion, MultiMatch, PrestoSpace, VIDI-Video, LiWA Living Web Archives (Research Project), Communia, Video Active (European Research Project)  and the streaming mobile app Radio Garden, which gives listeners access to radio stations worldwide, perhaps their best known research project.

See also
 List of music museums

References

External links

 

Media museums in the Netherlands
Museums in North Holland
Museums established in 1997
1997 establishments in the Netherlands
Television archives
Sound archives
Film archives in Europe
20th-century architecture in the Netherlands